Albert Selim El-Mankabadi (10 March 1917 – 1 August 1970) was an Egyptian rower. He competed in two events at the 1952 Summer Olympics.

References

External links
 
 

1917 births
1970 deaths
Egyptian male rowers
Olympic rowers of Egypt
Rowers at the 1952 Summer Olympics
Place of birth missing
20th-century Egyptian people